The 2021 Ohio Bobcats football team represented Ohio University in the 2021 NCAA Division I FBS football season. They were led by 1st-year head coach Tim Albin and played their home games at Peden Stadium in Athens, Ohio, as members of the East Division of the Mid-American Conference. The Bobcats finished the season 3–9 and 3–5 in the MAC to finish in third place in the East Division.  This was Ohio's first losing season since 2008.

Previous season

The Bobcats finished the 2020 season 2–1 to finish in a tie for third place in the East Division.

Schedule

Personnel

Roster

Source:

References

Ohio
Ohio Bobcats football seasons
Ohio Bobcats football